Matarangi is a beach settlement on the Coromandel Peninsula of New Zealand, with around 420 permanent residents in 2018 which increases to over 7000 holidaymakers during the summer period of late December to February. It was developed in the 1980s as a purpose-built resort town and occupies a white sand peninsula between the Whangapoua Harbour and historic Mercury Bay. It is half an hour from the towns of Coromandel to the west and Whitianga to the south east.

Matarangi has a mix of older, smaller holiday houses (known in New Zealand as baches), while waterfront sections have luxury holiday homes and prestige lifestyles. The main attraction for families is the 4 km long white sand ocean beach which provides safe swimming all year round and surfing when the conditions are right. Beach access is from Kenwood Drive which leads to the Village Green with picnic facilities and a playground or from Ocean Close. The harbour also offers swimming, boating, kite surfing, fishing and bird watching, with an upgraded boat ramp, boat parking and picnic area. Occupying the scenic end of the sand spit ″the pines″ is "The Dunes", a Bob Charles-designed championship eighteen-hole golf course with a licensed club house, restaurant and pro shop. There is also a bowling green and there are several public tennis courts in the town. 

The small shopping centre has a Four Square store, liquor outlet, cafe, gift store and two real estate agencies. Accommodation consists of Matarangi Villas close to the golf course and holiday homes that can be rented privately or through Air BnB and other holiday rental agents.

Demographics
Matarangi is described by Statistics New Zealand as a rural settlement. Matarangi is part of the larger Mercury Bay North statistical area.

Matarangi had a population of 420 at the 2018 New Zealand census, an increase of 117 people (38.6%) since the 2013 census, and an increase of 168 people (66.7%) since the 2006 census. There were 207 households, comprising 207 males and 213 females, giving a sex ratio of 0.97 males per female, with 39 people (9.3%) aged under 15 years, 33 (7.9%) aged 15 to 29, 180 (42.9%) aged 30 to 64, and 162 (38.6%) aged 65 or older.

Ethnicities were 93.6% European/Pākehā, 10.0% Māori, 0.7% Pacific peoples, 2.1% Asian, and 0.7% other ethnicities. People may identify with more than one ethnicity.

Although some people chose not to answer the census's question about religious affiliation, 50.0% had no religion, 36.4% were Christian, 1.4% were Buddhist and 0.7% had other religions.

Of those at least 15 years old, 66 (17.3%) people had a bachelor's or higher degree, and 63 (16.5%) people had no formal qualifications. 45 people (11.8%) earned over $70,000 compared to 17.2% nationally. The employment status of those at least 15 was that 129 (33.9%) people were employed full-time and 66 (17.3%) were part-time.

References

Thames-Coromandel District
Populated places in Waikato